Intimate may refer to:
 Intimate examination, a physical examination for medical purposes that includes examination of the breasts, genitalia, or rectum of a patient
 Intimate ion pair, the interactions between a cation, anion and surrounding solvent molecules
 Intimate media, media artifacts created and collected to capture and commemorate aspects of family and intimate relationships
 Intimate part, a place on the human body which it is usually customary to keep covered with clothing in public areas
 Intimate relationship, a particularly close interpersonal relationship

Music
 Intimate (Shizuka Kudo album)
 Intimate (Toni Pearen album), or the title track
 Intimate (Smokey Robinson album), or the title track
 "Intimate", a 2018 song by Yungen featuring Craig David

See also
Intimacy (disambiguation)